John Zimmerman was an American politician. He served as the eighth mayor of Lancaster, Pennsylvania from 1856 to 1857.

References

Mayors of Lancaster, Pennsylvania